Pavlínov is a municipality and village in Žďár nad Sázavou District in the Vysočina Region of the Czech Republic. It has about 300 inhabitants.

Gallery

References

External links

Villages in Žďár nad Sázavou District